A single-displacement reaction, also known as single replacement reaction or exchange reaction, is a chemical reaction in which one element is replaced by another in a compound.

It can be represented generically as:

A + BC -> AC + B

where either

A and B are different metals (or any element that forms cation like hydrogen) and C is an anion; or

A and B are halogens and C is a cation.

This will most often occur if A is more reactive than B, thus giving a more stable product. The reaction in that case is exergonic and spontaneous.

In the first case, when A and B are metals, BC and AC are usually aqueous compounds (or very rarely in a molten state) and C is a spectator ion (i.e. remains unchanged).

 A(s) + \underbrace{B+(aq) +  C^{-}(aq)}_{BC(aq)} -> \underbrace{A+(aq) + C^{-}(aq)}_{AC(aq)} + B(s)

In the reactivity series, the metals with the highest propensity to donate their electrons to react are listed first, followed by less reactive ones. Therefore, a metal higher on the list can displace anything below it. Here, is a condensed version of the same: 

 
 

Similarly, the halogens with the highest propensity to acquire electrons are the most reactive. The activity series for halogens is: 

 F2>Cl2>Br2>I2 

Due to the free state nature of A and B, single displacement reactions are also redox reactions, involving the transfer of electrons from one reactant to another. When A and B are metals, A is always oxidized and B is always reduced. Since halogens prefer to gain electrons, A is reduced (from 0 to -1) and B is oxidized (from -1  to 0).

Cation replacement
Here one cation replaces another:

 A + BC -> AC + B 

(Element A has replaced B in compound BC to become a new compound AC and the free element B.)

Some examples are:

Fe + CuSO4 -> FeSO4 + Cu(v)
(Blue vitriol)(Green vitriol)

Zn + CuSO4 -> ZnSO4 + Cu(v)
(Blue vitriol)(White vitriol)

Zn + FeSO4 -> ZnSO4 + Fe(v)
(Green vitriol) (White vitriol)

These reactions are exothermic and the rise in temperature is usually in the order of the reactivity of the different metals.

If the reactant in elemental form is not the more reactive metal, then no reaction will occur. Some examples of this would be the reverse.

Fe + ZnSO4 ->  No Reaction

Anion replacement
Here one anion replaces another:

 A + CB -> CA + B 

(Element A has replaced B in the compound CB to form a new compound CA and the free element B.)

Some examples are:
 Cl2 + 2NaBr -> 2NaCl + Br2(v) 
 Br2 + 2KI -> 2KBr + I2(v) 
 Cl2 + H2S -> 2HCl + S(v) 

Again, the less reactive halogen cannot replace the more reactive halogen:

I2 + 2KBr ->  no reaction

Common reactions

Metal-acid reaction
Metals react with acids to form salts and hydrogen gas.

Zn(s) + 2HCl(aq) -> ZnCl2(aq) + H2 ^

However less reactive metals can not displace the hydrogen from acids. (They may react with oxidizing acids though.)

Cu + HCl ->  No reaction

Reaction between metal and water
Metals react with water to form metal oxides and hydrogen gas. The metal oxides further dissolve in water to form alkalies.

Fe(s) + H2O (g) -> FeO(s) + H2 ^

Ca(s) + 2H2O (l) -> Ca(OH)2(aq) + H2 ^

The reaction can be extremely violent with alkali metals as the hydrogen gas catches fire.

Metals like gold and silver, which are below hydrogen in the reactivity series, do not react with water.

Metal extraction
Coke or more reactive metals are used to reduce metals by carbon from their metal oxides, such as in the carbothermic reaction of zinc oxide (zincite) to produce zinc metal:
ZnO + C -> Zn + CO
and the use of aluminium to produce manganese from manganese dioxide:
3MnO2 + 4Al -> 3Mn + 2Al2O3
Such reactions are also used in extraction of boron and silicon. 
3SiO2 + 4Al -> 3Si + 2Al2O3
B2O3 + 3Mg -> 2B + 3MgO

Thermite reaction
Using highly reactive metals as reducing agents leads to exothermic reactions that melt the metal produced. This is used for welding railway tracks.

Fe2O3(s) + 2 Al(s) -> 2 Fe(l) + Al2O3(s)
(Haematite)

3CuO + 2Al -> 3Cu + Al2O3

Silver tarnish

Silver tarnishes due to the presence of hydrogen sulfide, leading to formation of silver sulfide. 

4Ag + 2H2S + O2 -> 2Ag2S + 2H2O

3Ag2S + 2Al -> 6Ag + Al2S3

Extraction of halogens

Chlorine is manufactured industrially by the Deacon's process. The reaction takes place at about 400 to 450 °C in the presence of a variety of catalysts such as CuCl2. 

4HCl + O2 -> 2 Cl2 + 2H2O 

Bromine and iodine are extracted form brine by displacing with chlorine. 

2HBr + Cl2 -> 2HCl + Br2 ^ 

2HI + Cl2 -> 2HCl + I2 ^

See also
Double-displacement reaction
Decomposition reaction
Combination reaction
Substitution reaction

References

External links 

Reactivity series by RSC

Halogen displacement reaction by RSC

Chlorine water reacting with Iodide and Bromide, YouTube
Chemical reactions